Athens is a city and the county seat of Henderson County, Texas, in the United States. As of the 2020 census, the city population was 12,857. The city has called itself the "Black-Eyed Pea Capital of the World." Athens was selected as one of the first "Certified Retirement Communities" in Texas. It was named after Athens the capital of Greece.

Geography

Athens is located in central Henderson County at  (32.202782, –95.849140).

Lake Athens is a 1,799 acre reservoir located in the eastern half of the city.

The climate in this area is characterized by hot, humid summers and generally mild to cool winters.  According to the Köppen climate classification system, Athens has a humid subtropical climate, Cfa on climate maps.The town was heavily damaged by a low-end EF2 tornado on November 4, 2022.

Demographics

As of the 2020 United States census, there were 12,857 people, 4,095 households, and 2,733 families residing in the city.

As of the census of 2010, there were 12,710 people, 4,110 households, and 2,807 families residing in the city. The population density was 772.8 people per square mile (298.3/km2). There were 4,549 housing units at an average density of 311.2 per square mile (120.1/km2). The racial makeup of the city was 72.14% White, 19.23% African American, 0.31% Native American, 0.64% Asian, 0.06% Pacific Islander, 6.17% from other races, and 1.45% from two or more races. Hispanic or Latino people of any race were 17.37% of the population.

There were 4,110 households, out of which 32.7% had children under the age of 18 living with them, 49.1% were married couples living together,

15.4% had a female householder with no husband present, and 31.7% are classified as non-families by the United States Census Bureau. 
Of 4,110 households, 131 are unmarried partner households: 106 heterosexual, 14 same-sex male, and 11 same-sex female households. 28.6% of all households were made up of individuals, and 14.6% had someone living alone who was 65 years of age or older. The average household size was 2.55 and the average family size was 3.13.

In the city, the population was spread out, with 26.4% under the age of 18, 11.6% from 18 to 24, 25.0% from 25 to 44, 19.1% from 45 to 64, and 17.9% who were 65 years of age or older. The median age was 35 years. For every 100 females, there were 90.2 males. For every 100 females age 18 and over, there were 83.3 males.

The median income for a household in the city was $29,372, and the median income for a family was $35,359. Males had a median income of $27,388 versus $19,375 for females. The per capita income for the city was $16,561. About 14.7% of families and 18.3% of the population were below the poverty line, including 21.5% of those under age 18 and 16.7% of those age 65 or over.

Government

Local government
According to the city's most recent Comprehensive Annual Financial Report, the city's various funds had $8.0 million in revenues, $8.6 million in expenditures, and $4.2 million in total assets, $0.7 million in total liabilities, and $0.7 million in cash and investments.

The structure of the management and coordination of city services is:

State and federal representation
The Texas Department of Criminal Justice (TDCJ) operates the Athens District Parole Office in Athens.

The United States Postal Service operates the Athens Post Office.

Education
The city of Athens is served by the Athens Independent School District and is home to the Athens High School Hornets. A very small portion in the eastern outskirts of Athens is within the Brownsboro Independent School District.

The main campus of Trinity Valley Community College is located in Athens.

Arts and culture
The Texas Freshwater Fisheries Center, operated by the Texas Parks and Wildlife Department, is located east of the city on Lake Athens.

The East Texas Arboretum and Botanical Society is located in the northwest part of the city.

In addition to Lake Athens, Cedar Creek Reservoir is located northwest of the city, and is a popular vacation destination, especially for Dallas-Fort Worth Metroplex residents, some of whom own a lake home on or nearby.  Lake Palestine is located to its east.

Notable people

 Fred Agnich, Texas businessman, rancher, state legislator from Dallas; owned a wildlife preserve near Athens
 Fletcher Davis, one of a number of Americans who lay claim to inventing the modern hamburger
 Pete Donohue, Major League Baseball pitcher
 Jakeem Grant, NFL wide receiver for Miami Dolphins
 William R. Hawn, businessman, sportsman
 William Wayne Justice, former United States District Court judge
 Fred LaRue, former aide to President Richard Nixon. Served four and a half months in prison after pleading guilty to obstruction of justice for his actions pertaining to the Watergate break-in and the following scandal
 Terrence McGee, former NFL cornerback for Buffalo Bills
 Tay Money, rapper
 Clint W. Murchison, Jr., businessman and founder of the Dallas Cowboys football team
 Sid W. Richardson, native of Athens, Texas, oilman, cattleman, philanthropist
 James C. Spencer, former member of Texas House of Representatives, 1939-1941, 1947-1949, later Henderson County Judge
 Barron Tanner, former NFL defensive lineman

Notes

References

External links
 City of Athens official website
 Athens Chamber of Commerce
 Athens Economic Development Corp.
 
 Bill HCR-15 of the Texas State Legislature (November 2006) designating Athens as the "Original Home of the Hamburger"

Cities in Texas
Cities in Henderson County, Texas
County seats in Texas
Micropolitan areas of Texas
U.S. Route 175